Anjir Liton (born 17 June 1965) is a Bangladeshi Poet and Children's Writer. He is the Director General of Bangladesh Children's Academy. He won Bangla Academy Literary Award for His Children's Writing in 2020 for his contribution to children's literature.

Birth and Education 
Liton was born on 17 June 1965 in Mymensingh district of Bangladesh. He spent his childhood and adolescence there. His first writing was published in Dainik Jahan. He completed his graduation in Political Science from Rajshahi University.

Working life 
In 1992, Liton's first book Khara Duto Shing (খাড়া দুটো শিং) was published. Besides writing children's literature, he has planned and written various programs for television and radio. In 2016, he was appointed as the Director of Bangladesh Shishu Academy for one year on contractual basis. He succeeded Musharraf Hossain in this position.

Awards 

 Agrani Bank Children's Literature Award
 M Nurul Quader Children's Literature Award
 Kusum'r Sera Best Literary Award
 Futte Dew Ful Award
 Professor Mohammad Khaled Children's Literature Award
 Bangla Academy Literature Award for Children's Literature (2020)

References

Living people
Bangladeshi poets
1965 births